Karod Kala (Kadod Kala) is a village and a Gram panchayat in Badnawar tehsil of the Dhar district  in the state of Madhya Pradesh, India.

References

Villages in Dhar district